Kim Chang-bon (born 1919) was a politician and military officer of North Korea. He belonged to the Manchu faction, the mainstream of the Workers' Party of Korea led by Kim Il Sung. He was sometimes mentioned as Kim Chang Feng. Kim Chang-deok is also known as his brother. After the establishment of the Democratic People's Republic of Korea and the end of Korean War he held various high positions in the North Korean Political system.

Biography
Born in Kyongwon County, North Hamgyong in 1919. Worked as the 5th member of the 1st Army of the Tohoku Anti-Japanese United Army Performed partisan activities under the direction of Ankichi. Escape the Japanese army and enter the Soviet Union. Active as a member of the Soviet reconnaissance unit. After the end of the Second World War, he arrived in Yanji with Kang Jian, led by Park Luo-gwan and Choi Gwang with about 30 people. In 1946 he returned home with Ken Kang and others. That same year, he was the captain of the 38th parallel security battalion.

During the Korean War, he was the 7th Regiment of the 3rd Division (Colonel). In October 1950 he was appointed as commander of the 19th Division Commander. In December 1950, 12th Division Commander. In April 1951, Commander of the 8th Corps. In July 1953 following the end of Korean War and the signing of the armistice, he was promoted to Major General and became the 7th Corps commander.

He studied at the USSR Academy of Military from mid-1956 to September 1958. In April 1956, he was elected as a candidate for the Politburo at the 3rd Congress of the Workers' Party of Korea. Since July 1959, he has been the Chief of General Staff of the Korean People's Army. He was elected as a member of the Politburo at the 4th Congress of the Workers' Party of Korea which took place in September 1961.

In October 1962, he became Minister of National Security. He was elected as a member of the Central Committee at the 2nd Conference of the Workers' Party of Korea on October 12, 1966. However, he was criticized in 1969 for "wasting the national treasury and purchasing only state-of-the-art weapons" and "ignoring the Labor Red Guard".

Works

References

|-

|-

1919 births
Possibly living people
Members of the Supreme People's Assembly
Workers' Party of Korea politicians
Korean communists
Korean independence activists
Defence ministers of North Korea
People from Kyongwon County
North Korean military personnel of the Korean War
Military Academy of the General Staff of the Armed Forces of the Soviet Union alumni